Lomagna is a comune (municipality) in the Province of Lecco in the Italian region Lombardy, located about  northeast of Milan and about  south of Lecco.

Lomagna borders the following municipalities: Carnate, Casatenovo, Missaglia, Osnago, Usmate Velate.

References

External links
 Official website

Cities and towns in Lombardy